This List of Germantown Academy  people catalogs notable alumni of Germantown Academy, a private school in Philadelphia, Pennsylvania.
Sierra Schmidt (Attended from 2010-2015), competitive freestyle swimmer, competitor and record setter in the 800m freestyle event of the 2015 Pan American Games
Dan Lovitz (Class of 2010), professional soccer player, currently plays for Nashville SC in Major League Soccer, 13 appearances for the United States national team in 2019. 
Cameron Ayers (Class of 2010), professional basketball player who currently plays for the Reno Bighorns of the NBA Development League. 2014 graduate of (Bucknell University)
Maggie Lucas (Class of 2010), professional women's basketball player, currently plays for the (Indiana Fever), two-time Big 10 Player of the Year at (Penn State University)
Jen Hoy (Class of 2009), professional women's soccer player, currently plays for the (Chicago Red Stars), member of the U-23 Women's World Cup team (Princeton University)
Caroline Doty (Class of 2008), basketball player (University of Connecticut Huskies)
Andrew Barrer (Class of 2002), movie producer, screenwriter of Ant-Man and the Wasp
Fran Crippen (Class of 2002), US National Team Swimmer. 6 Time National Champion.
Matt Walsh (Class of 2002), NBA basketball player (New Jersey Nets); played for University of Florida Gators
Jarrod Spector (Class of 1999), Tony Award nominee for his performance in Beautiful: The Carole King Musical.
Maddy Crippen (Class of 1998), United States 2000 Summer Olympics swim team, 3 time National Champion
Bradley Cooper (Class of 1993), Oscar-nominated film and TV actor (Sex and the City, Alias, Wedding Crashers, Wet Hot American Summer, The Hangover', and Silver Linings Playbook)
Brian Klugman (Class of 1993), film and TV actor, scriptwriter (Psych, Tron: Legacy)
Alvin Williams (Class of 1993), NBA basketball player (Toronto Raptors) and sports commentator (Comcast SportsNet)
Michael F. Gerber (Class of 1990), Pennsylvania State Representative
Deirdre Quinn (Class of 1989), actress (Miss Congeniality, The Diary of Ellen Rimbauer (film), Heroes)
Trina Radke (Class of 1989), Olympic Swimmer, 1988 Olympics, USA National Champion, American Record Holder, and U.S. Team Captain.
David Wharton (Class of 1987), Olympic silver medalist (Seoul, 1988) in the 200 m swimming Individual Medley
Mike Richter (Class of 1985), New York Rangers goaltender
Randolph Cohen (Class of 1983), financial economist, associate professor at the MIT Sloan School of Management
Eric Lipton (Class of 1983), Pulitzer Prize-winning journalist and author, currently with the New York TimesBrian L. Roberts (Class of 1977), CEO of Comcast
Timothy Stack (Class of 1974), actor, writer and producer (Parker Lewis Can't Lose, Son of the Beach, My Name is Earl)
Eric Minkin (Class of 1968), American-Israeli basketball player
Edward Piszek Trustee, co-founder of Mrs. Paul's Kitchens
Martin "Cruz" (William) Smith (Class of 1960), novelist (Gorky Park)
Frederick Crews, literary critic, University of California, Berkeley professor, and noted anti-Freudian scholar
Bill Tilden (Class of 1910), professional tennis player
Charles Darrow (Class of 1907), claimed inventor of Monopoly board game
George Washington Hill (Class of 1899, didn't graduate), President of American Tobacco Company 1925-1946
Charles Day (Class of 1895), consulting engineer and co-founder of Day & Zimmermann
Owen Josephus Roberts (Class of 1891), associate justice of the United States Supreme Court
Thomas Sovereign Gates (Class of 1889), University of Pennsylvania president
Howard Henry (Class of 1889), All-American halfback for the 1903 Princeton Tigers football team, U.S. Army captain
James DeWolf Perry (Class of 1887), 7th Bishop of Rhode Island, Presiding Bishop of the Episcopal Church (1930-1937)
Witmer Stone (Class of 1883), ornithologist, botanist, mammalogist
Frederick Winslow Taylor (did not graduate),  efficiency expert; inventor of Scientific Management
Owen Wister (Class of 1878, but did not graduate), author of The Virginian'' and other classics of Western fiction
Alfred C. Harmer (Class of 1843), U.S. congressman and shoe manufacturer
Robert Montgomery Bird (Class of 1824), physician; playwright
Sidney George Fisher (Class of c. 1820), noted diarist, lawyer, orator, and gentleman
George Washington Parke Custis (attended 1790s), step-grandson and adopted son of President George Washington
Hilary Baker (attended 1760s), mayor of Philadelphia (1796-1798), son of Headmaster Hilarius Becker

References

Lists of American people by school affiliation